(1911 – 30 September 1997) was a Japanese naval aviator and warrant flying officer of the Imperial Japanese Navy who flew a floatplane from the long-range submarine aircraft carrier  and conducted the Lookout Air Raids in southern Oregon on September 9, 1942, making him the only Axis pilot during World War II to aerial bomb the contiguous United States. Using incendiary bombs, his mission was to start massive forest fires in the Pacific Northwest near the city of Brookings, Oregon with the objective of drawing the U.S. military's resources away from the Pacific Theater. The strategy was also later used in the Japanese fire balloon campaign.

Early life and military career
Nobuo Fujita joined the Imperial Japanese Navy in 1932 and became a pilot in 1933. Fujita also had a younger brother who was killed in the war.

Pearl Harbor and U.S. West Coast

Fujita's plane, a Yokosuka E14Y "Glen" seaplane, did not function properly, and he was unable to participate in the reconnaissance mission planned before the attack.

After the attack on Pearl Harbor, I-25 patrolled along the West Coast of the United States with eight other submarines. They attacked U.S. shipping before returning to their base in Kwajalein Atoll in the Marshall Islands. They arrived there on January 11, 1942 to be refuelled and refurbished.

South Pacific
I-25s next mission was to reconnoiter the Australian harbours of Sydney, Melbourne and Hobart, followed by the New Zealand harbours of Wellington and Auckland. On 17 February 1942, Nobuo Fujita took off in the "Glen" for a reconnaissance flight over Sydney Harbour to examine the city's airbase. By 07:30, he had returned to I-25, disassembled the "Glen" and stowed it in the water-tight  hangar.

The next mission was a similar flight over Melbourne, Australia. Fujita took off from Cape Wickham on King Island at the western end of Bass Strait, about halfway between Victoria and Tasmania. The floatplane was launched on 26 February for its flight to Melbourne over Port Phillip Bay.

Fujita's next reconnaissance flight in Australia was over Hobart on 1 March. I-25 then headed for New Zealand, where Fujita flew a reconnaissance flight over Wellington on 8 March. He flew over Auckland on 13 March, followed by Fiji on 17 March. The submarine returned to its base at Kwajalein on 31 March.

Pacific Northwest
On 28 May, Fujita performed a reconnaissance of Kodiak, Alaska, in preparation for the invasion of the Aleutian Islands. On 21 June, I-25 shelled the U.S. base of Fort Stevens, near Astoria, Oregon. Fujita was on the deck of I-25 during the attack.

Bombing Oregon

Fujita himself suggested the idea of a submarine-based seaplane to bomb military targets, including ships at sea, and attacks on the U.S. mainland, especially the strategic Panama Canal. Submarine aircraft carriers such as the giant I-400-class submarines would be developed specifically to bomb the Panama Canal.

At 06:00 on 9 September, I-25 surfaced west of the Oregon/California border where she launched the Glen, flown by Fujita and Petty Officer Okuda Shoji, with a  load of two incendiary bombs. Fujita dropped two bombs, one on Wheeler Ridge on Mount Emily in Oregon. The location of the other bomb is unknown. The Wheeler Ridge bomb started a small fire  due east of Brookings, which U.S. Forest Service employees were able to extinguish. Rain the night before had made the forest very damp, and the bombs were rendered essentially ineffective. Fujita's plane had been spotted by two men, Howard Gardner and Bob Larson, at the Mount Emily fire lookout tower in the Siskiyou National Forest. Two other lookouts (the Chetco Point Lookout and the Long Ridge Lookout) reported the plane, but could not see it due to heavy fog. The plane was seen and heard by many people, especially when Fujita flew over Brookings in both directions. At about noon that day, Howard Gardner at the Mount Emily Lookout reported seeing smoke. The four U.S. Forest Service employees discovered that the fire was caused by a Japanese bomb. Approximately  of fragments, including the nose of the bomb, were turned over to the United States Army.

After the bombing, I-25 came under attack by a USAAF aircraft on patrol, forcing the submarine to dive and hide on the ocean floor off Port Orford. The American attacks caused only minor damage, and Fujita flew a second bombing sortie three weeks later on 29 September. Fujita used the Cape Blanco Light as a beacon. After 90 minutes flying east, he dropped his bombs and reported seeing flames, but the bombing remained unnoticed in the U.S.

The submarine torpedoed and sank the SS Camden and SS Larry Doheny and then sailed for home. On its way to Japan, I-25 sank the Soviet submarine L-16, which was in transit between Dutch Harbor, Alaska, and San Francisco, California, mistaking it for an American submarine (Japan and the USSR were not at war at the time).

The two attacks on Oregon in September 1942 were the only enemy aircraft bombings on the contiguous United States and were the second time the continental United States was attacked by such aircraft during World War II, following the bombing of Dutch Harbor in Unalaska, Alaska three months earlier.

Later life
Fujita continued as an Imperial Japanese Navy pilot, mainly in reconnaissance duties, until 1944, when he was transferred to the training of kamikaze pilots. After the war he opened a hardware store in Ibaraki Prefecture, and later worked at a company making wire.

Fujita was invited to Brookings in 1962, after the Japanese government was assured he would not be tried as a war criminal. He gave the City of Brookings his family's 400-year-old katana in friendship. Ashamed of his actions during the war, Fujita had intended to use the sword to commit seppuku if he were given a hostile reception. However, the town treated him with respect and affection, although his visit still raised some controversy.

Impressed by his welcome in the United States, during his visit, he promised to invite Brookings students to Japan. Despite the bankruptcy of his company, Fujita made good on his promise by co-sponsoring the visit of three female students from Brookings-Harbor High School to Japan in 1985. During the visit, Fujita received a dedicatory letter from an aide of President Ronald Reagan "with admiration for your kindness and generosity."

Fujita returned to Brookings in 1990, 1992, and 1995. In 1992, he planted a tree at the bomb site as a gesture of peace.  In 1995, he moved the samurai sword from the Brookings City Hall into the new library's display case. Fujita helped to gather money to build the library.

He was made an honorary citizen of Brookings several days before his death at a hospital in Tsuchiura, Ibaraki Prefecture, on September 30, 1997, at the age of 85. In October 1998, his daughter, Yoriko Asakura, buried some of Fujita's ashes at the bomb site.

See also
Attacks on North America during World War II

References

Further reading

External links

Samurai in the Oregon Sky Produced by Ilana Sol

Japanese military personnel of World War II
Japanese naval aviators
1911 births
Attack on Pearl Harbor
1997 deaths
Oregon Coast
Curry County, Oregon
Japanese World War II pilots
Imperial Japanese Navy officers